Popayato is a village in Popayato district, Pohuwato Regency in Gorontalo province. Its population is 978.

Climate
Popayato has a tropical rainforest climate (Af) with heavy to rainfall year-round.

References

Populated places in Central Sulawesi